David Moore (born 17 December 1959) is an English former professional footballer, football manager and physiotherapist. He is the head physiotherapist of Football League Two club Grimsby Town.

As a player, he made nearly 300 appearances in the Football League between 1978 and 1990, playing as a defender for Grimsby Town, Carlisle United, Blackpool and Darlington. He also played non-league football for Boston United.

In 1994, he became manager of Scunthorpe United but was replaced two years later by Mick Buxton.

Career

As a player
He played for his hometown club Grimsby Town, Carlisle United, Blackpool, Darlington and Boston United.

As a coach
Moore managed Scunthorpe United between 1994 and 1996, with a record of played 99, won 37, lost 36, drawn 26. He lost his job after a poor run of form in February and March 1996, and was replaced by Mick Buxton.

Moore re-joined Grimsby Town as the clubs physiotherapist. In February 2011 he took over as the club's caretaker manager following the sacking of Neil Woods and on 5 March 2011 Moore and Robbie Stockdale took charge of the club's 2–1 victory over A.F.C. Wimbledon. Moore and Stockdale's reign lasted four games with victories against A.F.C. Wimbledon and Kettering Town, a draw with Gateshead and a defeat against Bath City. On 23 March 2011 Grimsby appointed Paul Hurst and Rob Scott as joint managers, and with there no need for an Assistant Manager at the club Moore reverted to his role as physiotherapist.

Moore took over again as caretaker manager in 2016 following the resignation of Paul Hurst and stayed in the position until the appointment of Marcus Bignot. In 2020 he was temporarily appointed as caretaker assistant manager to assist Ben Davies following Ian Holloway's departure.

Sporting family
Moore is one of five members of his family to play for Grimsby, the other four being his brothers Kevin and Andy, his father Roy and his uncle Norman.

Managerial statistics

References

External links

1959 births
Living people
Footballers from Grimsby
English footballers
Association football defenders
Grimsby Town F.C. players
Carlisle United F.C. players
Blackpool F.C. players
Darlington F.C. players
Boston United F.C. players
English Football League players
English football managers
Scunthorpe United F.C. managers
Grimsby Town F.C. non-playing staff
Grimsby Town F.C. managers
Association football physiotherapists
Alumni of the University of Salford